Anthony Naveed is a Pakistani politician who was elected member for the Provincial Assembly of Sindh.

Political career
He was elected to Provincial Assembly of Sindh on a reserved seat for minorities in 2018 Pakistani general election representing Pakistan Peoples Party Parliamentarians

Naveed is a Roman Catholic and was elected under Pakistan's law of allotting seats to religious minorities. As member of the assembly, he has spoken out against a proposed bill that would have applicants state their religious identification before applying, arguing that it would further promote religious discrimination.

References

Living people
Pakistan People's Party politicians
Politicians from Sindh
Year of birth missing (living people)
Pakistani Roman Catholics